Leford Green (born 14 November 1986, St. Mary, Jamaica) is a former Jamaican track and field athlete who specialised in the 400 metre hurdles and 400 metres. He is an alumnus of Johnson C. Smith University in Charlotte, North Carolina.

Competition record

References

External links 
 

1986 births
Living people
Jamaican male sprinters
Jamaican male hurdlers
Athletes (track and field) at the 2012 Summer Olympics
Olympic athletes of Jamaica
World Athletics Championships medalists
Athletes (track and field) at the 2014 Commonwealth Games
Commonwealth Games competitors for Jamaica
Athletes (track and field) at the 2007 Pan American Games
Athletes (track and field) at the 2015 Pan American Games
Pan American Games competitors for Jamaica
World Athletics Championships athletes for Jamaica
Central American and Caribbean Games gold medalists for Jamaica
Competitors at the 2010 Central American and Caribbean Games
Central American and Caribbean Games medalists in athletics
Johnson C. Smith University alumni
20th-century Jamaican people
21st-century Jamaican people